Sangeetha Sagara Ganayogi Panchakshara Gavai is a 1995 Indian Kannada-language biographical film, directed by Chindodi Bangaresh and produced by Chindodi Leela. Starring Lokesh in the titular role, the film also featured Girish Karnad and Vijay Raghavendra in other pivotal roles. The film is based on the life of Panchakshara Gawai (1892 - 1944), who was a blind singer from Karnataka who made a great difference to the life of many blind people in Indian society.

The film, upon release was critically acclaimed and won multiple awards both at the National and State levels. The musical score composed and written by Hamsalekha was highly acclaimed.

Cast
 Lokesh as Panchakshara Gawai
Vijay Raghavendra as young Panchakshara Gawai
 Girish Karnad as Hanagal Kumaraswamiji
 Kalyan Kumar
 Dheerendra Gopal
Gavai
 N. Basavaraj
 Enagi Balappa
 C. T. Savithri
 Madhuri
 Theresamma

Soundtrack 
The music of the film was composed by Hamsalekha. The soundtrack features 10 tracks which include a poetry compilation of Purandara Dasa and Tansen. While Hamsalekha won the National Film Award for Best Music Direction, singer S. P. Balasubrahmanyam won National Film Award for Best Male Playback Singer for the year 1995.

Awards
The film has won the following awards since its release.

National Film Awards 1995
 Won – National Film Award for Best Music Direction - Hamsalekha
 Won - National Film Award for Best Male Playback Singer - S. P. Balasubrahmanyam ("Umandu Ghamandu")

Karnataka State Film Awards 1995-96
 Won – Karnataka State Film Award for First Best Film
 Won – Karnataka State Film Award for Best Music Director – Hamsalekha
 Won – Karnataka State Film Award for Best Supporting Actor – Girish Karnad

References

External sources

1995 films
1990s Kannada-language films
Films scored by Hamsalekha
Indian biographical films
Films about blind people in India
1990s biographical films